The Santorini Facula is a facula (bright spot) on the surface of Titan, around a 40 km wide impact crater. It was named after the Greek island Santorini in 2006.

References

Surface features of Titan (moon)